

US military designations
YUH-60A prototype airframe 
YEH-60B specialized radar and avionics UH-60A modified for the proposed Stand-Off Target Acquisition System including an underslung rotating sensor in a canoe fairing 
EUH-60L Army Airborne Command and Control
GUH-60A non-flying Simulator
JUH-60A Evaluation and testing craft
YEH-60B prototype

CH-60S

EH-60

EH-60A
 Specialized Jammer
 A UH-60A modified for evaluation pursuant to the Quick Fix II EW Program. It was prepared for an AN/ALQ-151 multi-role tactical EW system, four dipole antennae were mounted in pairs on either side of the tailboom, and a deployable whip antenna was added beneath the aft section of the main cabin. The YEH-60A was equipped with the AN/ALQ-144 infrared countermeasures set and flare & chaff launchers and the standard AN/APR-39(V)1 receiver.

EH-60B
EW prototype variant
 Stand-Off Target Acquisition System (SOTAS) prototype.

EH-60C
specialized equipment and antenna 
 locate enemy signals traffic
 classify enemy signals traffic 
 disrupt enemy signals traffic

HH-60

HH-60 Jayhawk

HH-60 Pave Hawk

HH-60D Nighthawk
Canceled SAR
 Night Vision Goggle capable cockpit
 In Flight Refuelling
 ESSS
 IR jammer
 HIRSS exhaust suppressor 
 rotor de-icing
 color weather radar

HH-60G
Combat Rescue

HH-60L
Modified UH-60L medevac

HH-60M
Modified UH-60M medevac "M" does not stand for Medical/ Medevac

MH-60

MH-60A
FLIR
Modified avionics and navigation
in flight refueling probe
T700-GE-701

MH-60G
Pave Hawk

MH-60K
in flight refueling probe
terrain following radar
 extra internal tanks
 pylon-mounted auxiliary tanks from HH-60
 uprated engines
 CRT cockpit
 Texas Instruments FLIR
 In air refuelling<
 extra seating 
 night vision imaging system
 moving map display
 OBOGS
 T700-GE-701C engines
 main rotor brake
 missile plume detection
 radar warning receiver
 chaff & flare dispenser
 IR jammer, radio jammer
 laser warning receiver

MH-60L
30mm chain gun
2.75" rocket pods
M134D Gatling gun(door)

MH-60R
Converted SH-60B

MH-60S
SH-60 base with UH-60 2nd cargo door restored
combat SAR

MH-60T
Improved Jayhawk

SH-60

SH-60F
 inside ASW search, parred down SH-60B

SH-60R
 Redesignated as MH-60R, later.

UH-60
UH-60A RASCAL - Rotorcraft Air Crew System Concept
UH-60C
UH-60E
UH-60Q Medevac Dustoff - became HH-60A

UH-60A 

non assisted folding tail
Exhaust suppession
Tracor AN/ARN-148 Omega navigation system

UH-60B
CRT cockpit
New Engines

UH-60L
T700-GE-701c 1940shp
Revised Gearbox
Revised Flight Control
Electronics more emi resistant, particularly to German powerlines
Instrumentation panel made NVG compatible

UH-60M
New Avionics
Composite Rotor w/ wider chord
improved gearbox
New cockpit instrumentation including IVHMS computer
reinforced fuselage

UH-60V
New Avionics, UH-60L converted to Glass Cockpit

VH-60
VH-60A
First designation for VH-60N

VH-60D
Night Hawk VIP transport

VH-60N
Presidential transport helicopter also known as Marine One

Sikorsky internal model designations

S-70A
The S-70A is Sikorsky's designation for Black Hawk models produced for export.

S-70A-1
Desert Hawk; variant for Saudi Arabian military

S-70A-1L
Saudi Desert Hawk Medevac variant

S-70A-5
Variant for Philippine Air Force

S-70A-9
Variant for Australian Army, licence-built by Hawker de Havilland

S-70A-11
Variant for Jordanian Air Force

S-70A-12
Search and rescue variant for Japan Air Self-Defense Force (JASDF) and Japan Maritime Self-Defense Force (JMSDF)

S-70A-14
Variant for Royal Brunei Air Force; one in civil use by the Government of Brunei

S-70A-16
Test model fitted with Rolls-Royce Turbomeca RTM322 engines

S-70A-17
Variant for Turkish military

S-70A-19
Designation for aircraft to be license-built by Westland Helicopters in the United Kingdom (Westland WS-70); none produced

S-70A-21
Variant for Egyptian military

S-70A-24
Variant for Mexican military

S-70A-26
Variant for Moroccan military

S-70A-27
Variant for Royal Hong Kong Auxiliary Air Force

S-70A-33
Variant for Brunei, used as civil transport by the government

S-70A-42
Variant for Austrian Armed Forces

S-70B
The S-70B (originally S-70L) is Sikorsky's designation for export versions of the Sea Hawk naval helicopter with folding main rotors and tail. India will acquire several S-70B for its navy.

S-70C
S-70C
Search and Rescue Variant for Republic of China Air Force

S-70C(M)-1/2
 Export version for the Republic of China Navy, equipped with an undernose radar and a dipping sonar.

S-70i
The S-70i is Sikorsky's designation of the UH-60M produced by PZL Mielec in Poland.

Non-US military designations

AH-60L
Australian export model never produced

AH-60L
Colombian Air Force Arpia III gunship version, equipped with FLIR, machine guns and rockets 

UH-60J
Designation used by JASDF and JMSDF

UH-60JA
Licence-built by Mitsubishi for JASDF and JMSDF

SH-60J
Japanese Version of SH-60B without Sonobuoy launcher. Licence-built by Mitsubishi for JMSDF.

SH-60K
Upgraded from SH-60J (K stands for "Kai"), which has newer sensors and weapons. Manufactured by Mitsubishi.

HM-2
Designation used by Aviation of Brazilian Army

References